Alexander Brush (February 8, 1824 – June 1, 1892) was a Scottish Mayor of the City of Buffalo, New York, serving 1870–1873 and 1880–1881.

Early life
He was born on February 8, 1824, at Edinburgh, Scotland.

Career
In 1848, he moved to Buffalo and opened a brick making business.

Brush first served as Alderman for the third Ward in 1861 and reelected to that position until becoming street commissioner.  He was elected mayor November 2, 1869, as the Republican candidate.  He was re-elected in a special election held in February 1872.

During his term the cornerstone was laid for the County and City Hall, which was not completed until early in 1876.  At the end of his second term, he declined to be a candidate for re-election. In 1879, six years after retiring from public office, on November 4, 1879, he was once again elected mayor and served until 1881.

Personal life
In April 1862, he married Lucinda Bucklin (1840–1862) of Titusville, Pennsylvania; she died within the year and he remarried in 1866 to Mrs. Sarah A. (née Warner) Leonard (1835–1902) of South Wales, New York.

He died while traveling across the ocean to Europe on June 1, 1892. His body was laid to rest in Forest Lawn Cemetery.

References

External links

1824 births
1892 deaths
Mayors of Buffalo, New York
Burials at Forest Lawn Cemetery (Buffalo)
New York (state) Republicans
People who died at sea
19th-century American politicians
Politicians from Edinburgh
Mayors of places in New York (state)